The Tree of Life (Hebrew: עֵץ חַיִּים ʿĒṣ Ḥayyīm) is a diagram used in Kabbalah and various other mystical traditions. It usually consists of 10 or 11 nodes symbolizing different archetypes and 22 lines connecting the nodes. The nodes are often arranged into three columns to represent that they belong to a common category.

The nodes are usually represented as spheres and the lines are usually represented as paths. The nodes usually represent encompassing aspects of existence, God, or the human psyche. The lines usually represent the relationship between the concepts ascribed to the spheres or a symbolic description of the requirements to go from one sphere to another. The nodes are also associated to deities, angels, celestial bodies, values, single colors or combinations of them, and specific numbers. The columns are usually symbolized as pillars. These pillars usually represent different kinds of values, electric charges, or types of ceremonial magic. It is usually referred to as the Kabbalistic tree of life in order to distinguish it from other concepts with the same name. In the Jewish Kabbalah, the nodes are called sephiroth. The diagram is also used by Christian Cabbala, Hermetic Qabalah and Theosophy.

Scholars believe that the concept of a tree of life with different spheres encompassing aspects of reality traces its origins back to Assyria in the 9th century BC. The Assyrians also assigned values and specific numbers to their deities similar to those used by the later Jewish Kabbalah. The beginnings of the Jewish Kabbalah are traced back by scholars to the Medieval Age, originating in the Bahir and the Zohar. However, the first historical instance of the modern diagram appeared centuries later in the cover of the Latin translation of Gates of Light in the year 1516. Scholars have traced the origin of the art in the Porta Lucis cover to Johann Reuchlin.

Evolution 

The first historical instance of the modern tree of life was designed by Johann Reuchlin. Paolo Riccio's son, Hyeronomius, had actively exchanged letters and shared his father's work with Reuchlin before publication. Thus, in the year 1516, Reuchlin's diagram came to appear on the cover of the Paolo Riccio's Latin translation of Joseph Gikatilla's Gates of Light. The diagram only had 17 paths and, at the time, the concepts of 10 spheres and 22 letters were still distinct in the literature. In 1573, a version sketched by Franciscus Zillettus appeared in Cesare Evoli, De divinis attributis. This version introduced several innovations that would reappear in later versions: all the spheres were of the same size, the lines became wide paths, the spheres were aligned into 3 distinct columns, Malkuth was connected to three spheres, and astrological symbols for the known celestial bodies were used in conjunction with the Hebrew names to label the spheres. However, it also had only 17 paths, albeit distributed differently. Reuchlin's version was reprinted in Johann Pistorius' compilation of 1587. Finally, several versions from unknown artists introducing 21 and 22 paths appeared in the posthumous print editions of Moses Cordovero's Pardes Rimonim between 1592 and 1609. However, the diagrams with 22 paths lacked consistency with each other and none of them 
had the 22 letters. Between 1652 and 1654, Athanasius Kircher published his own version of the tree in Oedipus Aegyptiacus. Kircher might have designed his diagram in a syncretic attempt to reconcile several distinct ideas. This heavily annotated version, self-termed Sephirotic System, introduced more innovations: abstract concepts, divine names, the 22 Hebrew letters for each path, and new astrological symbols. Between 1677 and 1684, Christian Knorr von Rosenroth published Kabbala Denudat. He designed several new versions of the tree of life, introduced the first version with 11 spheres, placed Daath between Kether and Tiphareth, and attempted to derive the tree of life from elemental geometry.

Consequently, to modern day, two versions are widely circulated: one where Malkuth has 1 path, owing to Reuchlin's original; and another where Malkuth has three paths, owing to several later versions; both having 22 paths in total, corresponding each to a Hebrew letter, owing to Kircher's syncretism. With the resurgence of occultism in the 19th century, many new versions appeared, but without major innovations. In the 20th century, Aleister Crowley might have resurfaced the idea of Daath as an 11th hidden sphere between Kether and Tiphareth in his book Liber 777, syncretizing the concept with Kircher's symbols and von Rosenroth's diagrams. With the discovery of new planets, people might have tried to introduce more astrological symbols to their own versions of the diagram. As a result, there is no general agreement about the position of Uranus, Neptune and Pluto. However, in particular, it has been noted that Pluto bears resemblance with Daath: Pluto is a former planet, the last traditional celestial body to be discovered, and Daath is a hidden sphere, the last to be introduced. In the 21st century, enthusiasts might have rushed to attribute these collaborative works spanning centuries and involving several people through complex interactions to single authors. Thus, sometimes, the version where Malkuth has 3 paths is termed the Tree of Emanation, and the version where Malkuth has 1 path is termed the Tree of Return.

Interpretations

Chassidist 

According to Chassidist Kabbalist scholars, the tree of life is to be interpreted in the following way:

 The tree represents a series of divine emanations of God's creation itself ex nihilo, the nature of revealed divinity, the human soul, and the spiritual path of ascent by man. In this way, Kabbalists developed the symbol into a full model of reality, using the tree to depict a map of creation.
 The symbolic configuration is made of 10 spiritual principles, but 11 can be shown, since "Keter" and "Da'at" are interchangeable.
 The tree of knowledge of good and evil is equivalent to the 10 spheres seen from the last sphere of the diagram ("Malkuth"), and the original tree of life is equivalent to the 10 spheres seen from the middle sphere of the diagram ("Tiferet").
 Kabbalists believe the tree of life to be a diagrammatic representation of the process by which the universe came into being.
 On the tree of life, the beginning of the universe is placed in a space above the first sphere (named "Keter" or "crown" in English). It is not always pictured in reproductions of the tree of life, but is referred to universally as Ohr Ein Sof (אֵין סוֹף‎‎‎‎ אוֹר‎ in Hebrew or "endless light" in English).
 To Kabbalists, it symbolizes that point beyond which our comprehension of the origins of being can't go. It is considered to be an infinite nothingness out of which the first "thing", usually understood among Kabbalists to be something approximating "energy", exploded to create a universe of multiple things.
 Kabbalists also don't envision time and space as pre-existing and place them at the next three stages on the tree of life.
 First is "Keter", which is thought of as the product of the contraction of "Ein Sof" into a singularity of infinite energy or limitless light. In the Kabbalah, it is the primordial energy out of which all things are created.
 The next stage is "Chokhmah" (or "wisdom" in English), which is considered to be a stage at which the infinitely hot and contracted singularity expanded forth into space and time. It is often thought of as pure dynamic energy of an infinite intensity forever propelled forth at a speed faster than light.
 Next comes "Binah" (or "understanding" in English), which is thought of as the primordial feminine energy, the supernal mother of the universe which receives the energy of "Chokhmah", cooling and nourishing it into the multitudinous forms present throughout the whole cosmos. It is also seen as the beginning of time itself.
 Numbers are very important to Kabbalists, and the Hebrew letters of the alphabet also have a numerical value. Each stage of the emanation of the universe on the tree of life is numbered meaningfully from one ("Keter") to ten ("Malkuth"). Each number is thought to express the nature of its sphere.
 The first three spheres, called the "supernal" spheres, are considered to be the primordial energies of the universe. The next stages of evolution on the tree of life are considered to exist beyond a space on the tree, called the "Abyss", between the "supernals" and the other spheres, because their levels of being are so distinct from each other that they appear to exist in two totally different realities. The "supernal" spheres exist on a plane of divine energy. This is why another correspondence for "Binah" is the idea of suffering because the "supernal" maternal energy gives birth to a world that is inherently excluded from that divine union.
 After "Binah", the universe gets down to the business of building the materials it will need to fulfill its evolution and be creating new combinations of those materials until it is so dense that, by the stage of "Malkuth", the initial pure limitless energy has solidified into the physical universe.
 Since its energies are the basis of all creation, the tree of life can potentially be applied to any area of life, especially the inner world of man, from the subconscious all the way to what Kabbalists call the higher self.
 But the tree of life does not only speak of the origins of the physical universe out of the unimaginable but also of man's place in the universe. Since man is invested with mind, consciousness in the Kabbalah is thought of as the fruit of the physical world, through whom the original infinite energy can experience and express itself as a finite entity.
 After the energy of creation has condensed into matter, it is thought to reverse its course back up the tree until it is once again united with its true nature: "Keter". Thus, the Kabbalist seeks to know himself and the universe as an expression of God and to make the journey of return by means of the stages charted by the spheres, until he has come to the realization he sought.

See also
 Atziluth
 Flower of life
 Sephirot
 Thelema
 The path of the flaming sword
 Tree of death (Kabbalah)
 Tree of life (biblical)
 Tree of life
 Tree of the knowledge of good and evil

References

External links

 The Ilanot Project—A searchable descriptive catalogue of kabbalistic diagrams in manuscripts and books from Medieval Age to the 20th century

Christian Kabbalah
Hermetic Qabalah
Jewish symbols
Kabbalah
Kabbalistic words and phrases
Magic symbols
Religious diagrams